The 20 Grand was one of Detroit's most famous night clubs. It was located at the intersection of 14th Street and Warren Avenue. It opened by Bill Kabbus and Marty Eisner in 1953. It was destroyed by fire in 1958, at which point it was transformed into a multiplex facility for Black audiences.

The 20 Grand was a place where people could go to dance, and see live performances on Thursday, Friday and Saturday. There was also a club night for youths.

On the first floor of The 20 Grand there was a bowling alley and a fireside lounge that was used as a jazz room. On the upper floor there was a room called the Gold Room, which consist of a large banquet and a cabaret hall which could seat up to 1,200 people.

There was a studio inside The 20 Grand built for Ernie Durham,  a famous Detroit radio personality. There was also the Driftwood Lounge which was located next to the Golden Room, which was where most of the performances and shows took place. The Supremes, Chuck Jackson, Parliament-Funkadelic, Florence Ballard, The Utopias, and Stevie Wonder performed there. Mick Jagger first saw B.B King perform here in 1964.
  
There was a motel located next door where couples would check in after a long night out at the club. The name of the motel was Twenty Grand Motel but it was not owned by the owner of The 20 Grand; it was owned by a man named Ed Wingate.

In Pop Culture 
David Lasley's Missin' Twenty Grand album was named after The 20 Grand.

References

See also

McDougal, Weldon. The 20 Grand Story. [Online]Available http://www.soulfuldetroit.com/forum/index.html
McMurray, Clay. The 20 Grand Story. [Online]Available http://www.soulfuldetroit.com/forum/index.html
Meikle, David. The 20 Grand Story. [Online]Available http://www.soulfuldetroit.com/forum/index.html
Street, Cal. The 20 Grand Story. [Online]Available http://www.soulfuldetroit.com/forum/index.html
 Mick Jagger's comments at 2012 "Red, White and Blues" pbs white house performance

Culture of Detroit